The 2014–15 Moldovan Under-18 Division was the Moldovan annual football tournament. The season began on 6 September 2014 and ended on 28 May 2015. Zimbru Chișinău were the defending champions.

Stadia and locations

Squads
Players must be born on or after 1 January 1997, with a maximum of five players per team born between 1 January 1996 and 31 December 1996 allowed.

League table
The schedule consists of three rounds. During the first two rounds, each team plays each other once home and away for a total of 14 matches. The pairings of the third round will then be set according to the standings after the first two rounds, giving every team a third game against each opponent for a total of 21 games per team.

Results 
Matches 1−14

Matches 15−21

References

2014–15 in Moldovan football